Richeza of Poland (22 September 1013 – 21 May 1075) was Queen Consort of Hungary by marriage to Béla I of Hungary.

Life 
She was a daughter of King Mieszko II Lambert of Poland, and his wife, Richeza of Lotharingia, granddaughter of Emperor Otto II.

She is traditionally called Richeza, but contemporary sources do not confirm this name. Nowadays it is supposed that she was called Adelaide.

Between 1039 and 1043, she was married to king Béla of Hungary, who had served her father and taken part in her father's campaigns against the pagan Pomeranian tribes.

In 1048, her husband received one third of Hungary (Tercia pars Regni) as appanage from his brother, King Andrew I of Hungary, and the couple moved to Hungary. On 6 December 1060, her husband was crowned King of Hungary after defeating his brother.

Marriage and children
# 1039-1043: King Béla I of Hungary (c. 1016 – 11 September 1063)  
 King Géza I of Hungary ( 1040 – 25 April 1077)
 King Ladislaus I of Hungary (c. 1040 – 29 July 1095)
 Duke Lampert of Hungary (after 1050 – c. 1095)
 Sophia (after 1050 – 18 June 1095), wife firstly of Margrave Ulrich I of Carniola, and, secondly, of Duke Magnus I of Saxony
 Euphemia (after 1050 – 2 April 1111), wife of Prince Otto I of Olomouc
 Helen I of Hungary (after 1050 – c. 1091), wife of King Demetrius Zvonimir of Croatia

Sources
 Kristó, Gyula - Makk, Ferenc: Az Árpád-ház uralkodói (IPC Könyvek, 1996)
 Korai Magyar Történeti Lexikon (9-14. század), főszerkesztő: Kristó, Gyula, szerkesztők: Engel, Pál és Makk, Ferenc (Akadémiai Kiadó, Budapest, 1994)
 Magyarország Történeti Kronológiája I. – A kezdetektől 1526-ig, főszerkesztő: Benda, Kálmán (Akadémiai Kiadó, Budapest, 1981)

References

11th-century Polish people
11th-century Polish women
11th-century Hungarian people
11th-century Hungarian women
Hungarian queens consort
Polish princesses
1013 births
1075 deaths
Queen mothers